Madi Municipality may refer to:
Madi, Chitwan, a municipality in Chitwan District, Bagmati Province of Nepal
Madi, Sankhuwasabha, a municipality in Sankhuwasabha District, Province No. 1 of Nepal